Seventh-day Adventist College of Education may refer to:
Seventh-day Adventist College of Education (Ghana)
 Seventh-day Adventist College of Education (India)